Gratitude is an album by saxophonist Dayna Stephens.

Background
This was Stephens' second album with the lineup of Brad Mehldau, Julian Lage, Larry Grenadier, and Eric Harland. The first was Peace, from 2014.

Music and release
The album was produced by Matt Pierson. Stephens mostly plays tenor saxophone, but uses baritone for "Isfahan" and EWI for "We Had a Sister".

Release
Gratitude was released by Contagious Music on April 7, 2017.

Track listing
"Emilie"
"In a Garden"
"Amber Is Falling (Red and Yellow)"
"Woodside Waltz"
"We Had a Sister"
"The Timbre of Gratitude"
"Isfahan"
"Don't Mean a Thing at All"
"Clouds"

Personnel
 Dayna Stephens – baritone sax, tenor sax, EWI, synthesizer, bass
 Brad Mehldau – piano (tracks 1, 3, 5), tack piano (track 4)
 Julian Lage – guitar (tracks 2, 4, 6–8)
 Larry Grenadier – bass (tracks 1–8)
 Eric Harland – drums (tracks 1–6, 8, 9)

References

2017 albums
Dayna Stephens albums